Gerald Robert Sands (born September 28, 1987) is an American former professional baseball outfielder and first baseman. He was drafted by the Los Angeles Dodgers in the 25th round of the 2008 MLB Draft out of Catawba College and made his Major League Baseball (MLB) debut with them in 2011. He also played for the Tampa Bay Rays, Cleveland Indians, Chicago White Sox, Kiwoom Heroes of the KBO League, and Hanshin Tigers of Nippon Professional Baseball. Sands grew up in Smithfield, North Carolina and is a graduate of Smithfield-Selma High School.

Professional career

Los Angeles Dodgers
Sands struggled in his first professional season with the Gulf Coast Dodgers in 2008, hitting only .205 in 46 games. However, he turned it around in 2009, hitting .350 with 14 home runs in 41 games for the Ogden Raptors and earning a birth on the Pioneer League all-star team and a late-season promotion to the Class-A Great Lakes Loons.

In 2010 with Great Lakes, Sands hit .333 in 69 games, along with 18 home runs and 46 RBI. He was named Midwest League player of the week three times and selected to appear in the mid-season all-star game. He hit a home run in the All-Star game and was named the Player of the Game. Right after the all-star game he was promoted to the AA Chattanooga Lookouts in the Southern League, where he homered in his first game with the Lookouts. He played in 68 games in AA and hit .270 with 17 home runs and 47 RBI. He was selected as the Dodgers "Minor League Player of the Year" and given an invite to Major League spring training. He was assigned to the AAA Albuquerque Isotopes in the Pacific Coast League to begin the 2011 season. In 10 games, he hit .400 with five home runs.

Sands had his contract purchased by the Dodgers on April 18, 2011 and made his major league debut as the starting left fielder against the Atlanta Braves. In his first at-bat, he hit a double to right field off of Tim Hudson. Sands hit his first Major League home run on May 21 off of Mark Buehrle of the Chicago White Sox.  On May 24, he hit his second home run, a grand slam, off of J. A. Happ of the Houston Astros. He played in 41 games for the Dodgers, hitting only .200 and was sent back to AAA on June 8. He finished the Isotopes season with a .278 batting average, 29 home runs and 88 RBI. He returned to the Dodgers after the minor league season ended and was much more productive, finishing his season with 24 hits in his last 59 at-bats to raise his batting average to .253 for the season in 61 games and he also hit 4 home runs.

In 2012, he only appeared in 9 games with the Dodgers, where he hit only .208 in 23 at-bats. Sands spent most of the season with AAA Albuquerque, where he was selected as the designated hitter on the post-season All-PCL All-Star team. In 119 games with the Isotopes, he hit .296 with 26 homers and 107 RBI.

Pittsburgh Pirates
On October 4, the Dodgers traded Sands and Rubby De La Rosa to the Boston Red Sox, completing the blockbuster deal that brought Adrián González, Josh Beckett, Carl Crawford and Nick Punto to the Dodgers in August. On December 26, the Red Sox traded him (along with Stolmy Pimentel, Mark Melancon and Iván DeJesús, Jr.) to the Pittsburgh Pirates for Brock Holt and Joel Hanrahan. He spent the entire 2013 season in AAA with the Indianapolis Indians and hit just .207 in 106 games with only 7 home runs. He was designated for assignment by the Pirates on December 13, 2013.

Tampa Bay Rays
On December 23, 2013, he was claimed off waivers by the Tampa Bay Rays. He was designated for assignment on January 7, 2014 and outrighted to the AAA Durham Bulls. He was called up to the majors on June 1, 2014.

He elected free agency on November 9, after being designated for assignment a week earlier.

Cleveland Indians
On December 15, 2014, he signed a minor league contract with the Cleveland Indians. The Indians purchased his contract on April 10, 2015 and added him to the active roster. He was designated for assignment on April 29. He was called back up by the Indians on May 28. On May 30, in Sands' first at-bat since being called up, he hit a two-run shot for his sixth career home run. He was designated for assignment again the next day. He was called back up by the Indians on July 31. The Indians designated him for assignment on December 18.

Chicago White Sox

On December 23, 2015, the Chicago White Sox claimed Sands off waivers.

Somerset Patriots
On February 13, 2017, Sands signed with the Somerset Patriots of the Atlantic League of Professional Baseball.

San Francisco Giants
On June 3, 2017, Sands signed a minor league deal with the San Francisco Giants. On July 9, 2018, while playing for the Richmond Flying Squirrels of the Class AA Eastern League, Sands was named the league's player of the week.

Kiwoom Heroes
On August 7, 2018, Sands signed with the Nexen Heroes of the KBO League. In 2018, he hit .314 with 12 HR and 37 RBI in 25 games with the team. On November 23, he re-signed with the team, now named the Kiwoom Heroes, for the 2019 season.

Hanshin Tigers

On December 20, 2019, Sands signed with the Hanshin Tigers of Nippon Professional Baseball (NPB).

References

External links

1987 births
Living people
Albuquerque Isotopes players
American expatriate baseball players in Japan
American expatriate baseball players in South Korea
American people of Scottish descent
Baseball players from New York (state)
Catawba Indians baseball players
Charlotte Knights players
Chattanooga Lookouts players
Cleveland Indians players
Chicago White Sox players
Columbus Clippers players
Durham Bulls players
Great Lakes Loons players
Gulf Coast Dodgers players
Gulf Coast Pirates players
Hanshin Tigers players
Indianapolis Indians players
Indios de Mayagüez players
KBO League infielders
KBO League outfielders
Kiwoom Heroes players
Los Angeles Dodgers players
Major League Baseball outfielders
Ogden Raptors players
People from Middletown, Orange County, New York
Phoenix Desert Dogs players
Richmond Flying Squirrels players
Sacramento River Cats players
Somerset Patriots players
Tampa Bay Rays players
Tigres del Licey players
American expatriate baseball players in the Dominican Republic